Along These Lines is an outdoor 2015 stainless steel sculpture and paving medallion by Anne Storrs, installed at the Rhine–Lafayette Pedestrian Overpass landings at the MAX Orange Line's  Southeast 17th Avenue and Rhine Street station in southeast Portland, Oregon's Brooklyn neighborhood, in the United States.

According to TriMet, the pieces were inspired by the "similarity of trees and root systems to the branching pattern of train tracks". The stainless steel rings that circle both pieces display poetry by Cleveland High School student Monica Arnone and Paulann Petersen, Oregon Poet Laureate Emerita.

See also

 2015 in art

References

2015 establishments in Oregon
2015 sculptures
Brooklyn, Portland, Oregon
Sculptures on the MAX Orange Line
Outdoor sculptures in Portland, Oregon
Stainless steel sculptures in Oregon